The 1972–73 Midland Football Combination season was the 36th in the history of Midland Football Combination, a football competition in England.

Division One

Division One featured 17 clubs which competed in the division last season along with one new club:
Racing Club Warwick, promoted from the West Midlands League Division One

League table

References

1972–73
M